Bastos is a habitational surname of from Portugal and Galicia. Notable people with the name include:

Arts and entertainment
Augusto Roa Bastos (1917–2005), Paraguayan novelist and short story writer
Carlos Bastos (1925–2004), Brazilian artist and painter, leader of the Brazilian Modernist Movement
Juan Fernando Bastos (born 1958), American portrait artist of Bolivian descent
Lionel Bastos (born 1956), Mozambique singer, songwriter and music producer
Maria João Bastos (born 1975), Portuguese actress
Othon Bastos (born 1933), Brazilian film actor
Rafinha Bastos (born 1976), Brazilian comedian, journalist and television personality
Vânia Bastos (born 1956), Brazilian singer
Waldemar Bastos (1954–2020), Angolan musician

Sports
Alberto Bastos Lopes (born 1959), Portuguese former footballer
Ángel Bastos (born 1992), Spanish footballer
António Bastos Lopes (born 1953), Portuguese footballer
Édson Bastos (born 1979), Brazilian footballer
Fabrício Bastos (born 1981), Brazilian footballer
Fellipe Bastos (born 1990), Brazilian footballer 
Fransérgio Bastos (born 1980), Brazilian footballer
Gustavo Bastos (born 1983), Brazilian footballer known as Gustavo 
José de Bastos (born 1929), Portuguese footballer
Leonardo Lourenço Bastos (born 1975), Brazilian footballer, also known as Léo 
Marina Bastos (born 1971), Portuguese athlete
Mauro Bastos (born 1979), Portuguese footballer
Michel Bastos (born 1983), Brazilian international footballer
Tuta (footballer) (Moacir Bastos,; born 1974), Brazilian footballer
Rafael Bastos (born 1985), Brazilian footballer
Rafael Alves Bastos (born 1982), Brazilian footballer
Rodrigo Bastos (born 1967), Brazilian sport shooter
Tomas Bastos (born 1992), Brazilian footballer
Vítor Bastos (born 1990), Portuguese footballer
Yannick Bastos (born 1993), Luxembourger footballer

Others
Armando Baptista-Bastos (1933–2017), Portuguese journalist and writer
Aureliano Cândido Tavares Bastos (1839–1875), Brazilian politician, writer and journalist
Fernando Bastos de Ávila (1918–2010), Brazilian Roman Catholic priest 
Francisco de Paula Bastos (1793–1881), Portuguese noble, military and political figure
Jean-Claude Bastos de Morais (born 1967), Swiss-Angolan entrepreneur
José Moreira Bastos Neto (1953–2014), Brazilian Roman Catholic bishop
Márcio Thomaz Bastos (1935–2014), Brazilian politician and minister
Regina Bastos (born 1960), Portuguese lawyer and former politician

See also
 Bastos (disambiguation)

References 

Portuguese-language surnames